A glass basketball court is a basketball court with a glass floor that uses light emitting diodes (LEDs) to display the court lines and other graphics. After successful trials, FIBA legalized glass courts on October 1, 2022, for tier-1 competitions such as the FIBA Basketball World Cup. Glass courts are also approved for use for basketball at the Summer Olympics, whose tournaments are administered by FIBA.

History

ASB GlassFloor, a German manufacturer, first demonstrated a glass court for sports including basketball in 2011. Its first installation was for a 3x3 basketball event in Berlin in 2014. The company makes two different kinds of glass floor that are approved by FIBA for tier 1 competitions: ASB MultiSports, which offers LED lines, and ASB LumiFlex, which allows full motion video and player tracking. The LumiFlex option can display statistics and advertising for spectators in the arena in ways comparable to digital on-screen graphics on television broadcasts. In 2017, FIBA had allowed another manufacturer to supply LED-lined glass floors for tier 2 and tier 3 competitions, noting that it passed the association's requirements for player and ball reaction against the surface, and avoided the redundant lines on many existing multi-use courts.

In 2014, Nike developed a glass court with AKQA, Rhizomatiks and WiSpark for an exhibition in Shanghai. The company invited 30 players to practice with Kobe Bryant on the court, nicknamed the "House of Mamba." The custom court included motion tracking and lighting that could track players as they ran drills.

Glass courts are installed in several European basketball arenas, including the BallsportArena Dresden, the OYM Performance Center in Switzerland, and an arena at the University of Oxford.

Criticism

As of June 2022, a MultiSports floor costs about $80–90 (USD) per square foot and a LumiFlex floor costs about $500 per square foot; a full NBA court with LumiFlex technology would cost about $2 million, leading to doubt about its viability for widespread adoption. A glass court cannot be laid atop an ice surface, making it unsuitable for multi-purpose arenas like Crypto.com Arena, which host both ice hockey and basketball games during overlapping schedules.

References

Glass architecture
Sports rules and regulations
Sports venues by type
Playing field surfaces
Basketball equipment